(1900–1943) was a Japanese aviator and explorer. He was navigator on the first Japanese-built aircraft to fly from Japan to Europe.

Life
Tsukagoshi was born in Takasaki, Gunma Prefecture. His father was Japanese and his mother was British. It became famous on April 9, 1937, as the first Japanese-built aircraft to fly from Japan to Europe. The flight from Tokyo to London took 51 hours, 17 minutes and 23 seconds and was piloted by Masaaki Iinuma (1912–1941).

The total elapsed time since departure from the Tachikawa Airfield was 94 hours, 17 minutes and 56 seconds, with actual flight time for the whole distance of 15,357 km of was 51 hours, 19 minutes and 23 seconds. The flight was the first Fédération Aéronautique Internationale record to have been won by Japanese aviators.

Tsukagoshi disappeared over the Indian Ocean after departing from Singapore for Crimea in the prototype Tachikawa Ki-77.

See also
List of people who disappeared mysteriously at sea

References

Notes

Bibliography

 Francillon, René J. Japanese Aircraft of the Pacific War. London: Putnam Aeronautical, 1979. . (new edition 1987. .)

External links
Classical Airplanes Ki-15 Kamikaze
New Years cards commemorating the 1937 flight

1900 births
1940s missing person cases
1943 deaths
Aviators killed in aviation accidents or incidents
Flight navigators
Japanese aviation record holders
Japanese aviators
Japanese civilians killed in World War II
Japanese people of British descent
People from Takasaki, Gunma
People lost at sea
Victims of aviation accidents or incidents in 1943